Rajveer Purohit is an Indian-born American physician, Director of Reconstructive Urology at the Icahn School of Medicine at Mount Sinai Hospital in New York City, and Associate Professor in its Department of Urology.

Purohit co-developed the first staging system for anterior urethral strictures known as the Purohit-Blaivas anterior urethral stricture staging system. This system permits a standardization of description and analysis of urethral strictures. It is described in the Journal of Urology as providing “a practical syntax for staging stricture severity that makes good sense and is sorely needed”.

In 2018, Mt. Sinai appointed him co-director of its first fellowship in Reconstructive Urology (one of 17 such fellowships worldwide as of 2019) that trains methods of gender affirmation surgery including vaginoplasty, metoidioplasty and phalloplasty.

Biography

Purohit graduated Williams College in Williamstown, Massachusetts in 1993 with B.A. in history, and then Columbia University College of Physicians and Surgeons for an MD (1998), and Columbia University Mailman School of Public Health, where he earned his MPH (1999). After medical school, he completed a six-year residency in Urology at the University of California, San Francisco. He finished a fellowship in reconstructive urology and voiding dysfunction at the Weill Medical College of Cornell University. In 2018, he was visiting professor at Addis Ababa University in Ethiopia. He trained in techniques of vaginoplasty, metoidioplasty and other gender affirmation surgeries from Miroslav Djordjevic and Marci Bowers.

He is married to Mamta Purohit, and was a commissioned oil painter and
apprentice to Lalit Kala Akademi.

Research 

Purohit's areas of research include reconstructive urology, voiding dysfunction, urethral strictures, gender affirmation surgery, mesh complications, reconstructive urology voiding dysfunction, minimally invasive urology, urogynecology, urologic oncology, treatment of complications of surgery and radiation therapy, and erectile dysfunction.

His research in urethral strictures revealed that low-stage urethral strictures rarely progresses and does not require surgery.

Media recognition

Purohit is frequently invited by media to speak as an expert on penile fractures and urethroplasty. He is referenced in a book by  Ross Asdourian, Broken Bananah, in which the author documented his experience with a traumatic penile fracture as well as his experience with the resulting reconstructive penile and urethral surgery performed by Purohit.

Television interviews include CNN and NBC’s Today Show.

He has been quoted in several international media outlets.

Publications
Purohit has published 30 peer-reviewed articles, contributed six book chapters and authored “Diagnosis and Treatment of Overactive Bladder” published by Oxford University Press [].

His most cited peer-reviewed articles are: 
Purohit RS, Shinohara K, Meng MV, Carroll PR. Imaging clinically localized prostate cancer. Urologic Clinics. 2003 May 1;30(2):279-93. Cited 110 times according to GoogleScholar 
Purohit RS, Wu DS, Shinohara K, Turek PJ. A prospective comparison of 3 diagnostic methods to evaluate ejaculatory duct obstruction. The Journal of urology. 2004 Jan 1;171(1):232-6. Cited 99 times according to GoogleScholar 
Blaivas JG, Santos JA, Tsui JF, Deibert CM, Rutman MP, Purohit RS, Weiss JP. Management of urethral stricture in women. The Journal of urology. 2012 Nov;188(5):1778-82. Cited 42 times according to GoogleScholar 

Most recent published book chapters include: 
Laudano MA, Weinberger JM, Purohit RS, Blaivas JG, “Transvaginal Urethrolysis for Urethral Obstruction” Female Pelvic Surgery ed. Firoozi F., Springer 2014. []
Purohit RS, Blaivas JG, “Treatment of Overactive Bladder Refractory to Medications” Minimally Invasive Therapy for Urinary Incontinence and Pelvic Organ Prolapse” ed: Badlani, G., Springer 2014. []

Professional associations

Diplomate, American Board of Urology
Member, Society of Genitourinary Reconstructive Surgeons (GURS)
Member, American Urological Association
Member, Society of Urodynamics and Female Urology (SUFU)
Member, World Professional Association for Transgender Health (WPATH)

References

External links
Dr. Rajveer Purohit Clears All Doubts On Coronavirus, Lauds India's Lockdown Measure; Republic TV
A comedian broke his penis and wrote a book about it
Transgender Bottom Surgery with Insurance

Living people
1971 births
Surgeons specializing in transgender medicine
Williams College alumni